Snow Lake is an alpine lake in Custer County, Idaho, United States, located in the White Cloud Mountains in the Sawtooth National Recreation Area. The lake can be accessed via Sawtooth National Forest trail 601.

Snow Lake is southeast of D. O. Lee Peak, upstream of Cove Lake, and in the same basin as Gentian and Boulder Lakes.

References

See also
 List of lakes of the White Cloud Mountains
 Sawtooth National Recreation Area
 White Cloud Mountains

Lakes of Idaho
Lakes of Custer County, Idaho
Glacial lakes of the United States
Glacial lakes of the Sawtooth National Forest